Mallecina is one of 28 parishes (administrative divisions) in Salas, a municipality within the province and autonomous community of Asturias, in northern Spain.

Villages
 Caborno (Cabornu)
 El Barrio (El Barriu) 
 Fontanal 
 La Puerta 
 Las Corradas
 Mallecina (Maicina) 
 Valderrodero (Valderrodeiru)

References

Parishes in Salas